The 2005 New England Grand Prix was the fourth race for the 2005 American Le Mans Series season held at Lime Rock Park.  It took place on July 4, 2005.

Official results

Class winners in bold.  Cars failing to complete 70% of winner's distance marked as Not Classified (NC).

Statistics
 Pole Position - #1 ADT Champion Racing - 0:46.753
 Fastest Lap - #2 ADT Champion Racing - 0:47.787
 Distance - 
 Average Speed -

External links
 

N
Northeast Grand Prix
Grand